Kuwait made its Paralympic Games début at the 1980 Summer Paralympics in Arnhem, with a delegation in track and field. The country has participated in every subsequent edition of the Summer Paralympics, but has never taken part in the Winter Paralympics.

Kuwaiti competitors have won a total of 49 Paralympic medals, of which 12 gold, 17 silver and 21 bronze.

Medalists

See also
 Kuwait at the Olympics

References